Charles E. Laughton (June 4, 1846 – March 16, 1895) was an American politician and attorney from Washington and Nevada.

He was elected as a territorial representative for Stevens, Okanogan, and Spokane counties in 1888, before Washington Territory became a state. Laughton served as the first lieutenant governor of Washington and fifth lieutenant governor of Nevada. He was a member of the Republican Party.

References

1846 births
1895 deaths
People from Penobscot County, Maine
Lieutenant Governors of Nevada
Lieutenant Governors of Washington (state)
Nevada Republicans
Washington (state) Republicans
19th-century American politicians